Medina Azahara is a hard rock band formed in Córdoba, Spain in 1979.

History
The group was founded by Manuel Martínez (vocals), Miguel Galán (guitar), José Antonio Molina (drums), Manuel Molina (bass), and Pablo Rabadán (keyboards).

In their early years they were part of the Andalusian rock scene from the 80s, influenced by acts like Deep Purple, Pink Floyd, Triana, and Uriah Heep, among others.
Later on their style shifted toward a melodic heavy metal sound with neoclassical undertones.

The line-up has changed several times through the years, though the band is still recording and touring through Spain, with frontman Manuel Martínez standing as the only original member.

In 2018, three former members, Miguel Galán, José Antonio Molina, and Randy López, formed a tribute group called ExMedinas with other musicians, performing songs from the early period of the band.

Discography
Studio albums
 1979: Medina Azahara (AKA Paseando por la mezquita)
 1981: La esquina del viento
 1982: Andalucía
 1987: Caravana española
 1989: ... En Al-Hakim
 1992: Sin tiempo
 1993: Dónde está la luz
 1995: Árabe
 1998: Tánger
 2000: XX
 2001: Tierra de libertad
 2003: Aixa
 2005: La estación de los sueños
 2007: Se abre la puerta
 2009: Origen y leyenda
 2011: La historia continúa
 2012: La memoria perdida
 2014: Las puertas del cielo
 2016: Paraíso prohibido
 2018: Trece Rosas
 2021: llegó El Dia

Members
Manuel Martínez - vocals
Paco Ventura - guitar
Juanjo Cobacho - bass
Nacho Santiago - drums
Manuel Ibáñez - keyboards

Past members
Miguel Galán - guitar
José Antonio Molina - drums
Manuel S. Molina - bass
Randy López - bass
Pablo Rabadán - keyboards
José Miguel Fernández - bass

References

Spanish heavy metal musical groups
Musical quintets
Rock en Español music groups
Musical groups established in 1979